|}

This is a list of House of Assembly results for the 1928 Tasmanian election.

Results by division

Bass

Darwin

Denison

Franklin 

14668

Wilmot

See also 

 1928 Tasmanian state election
 Members of the Tasmanian House of Assembly, 1928–1931
 Candidates of the 1928 Tasmanian state election

References 

Results of Tasmanian elections
1928 elections in Australia